John Gordon (1776 – 16 July 1858) was a Scottish soldier and Tory politician.

Gordon was the son of Charles Gordon of Braid and Cluny, Aberdeenshire, and his wife Johanna Trotter. Gordon became 2nd lieutenant in the Royal Aberdeenshire Light Infantry on 2 December 1800. He was then lieutenant in the 7th Company of the 55th Aberdeenshire Militia on 25 April 1804. In 1804 Gordon made a grand tour of Egypt, carving his name on many ancient monuments. He returned home via Gibraltar where he boarded HMS Victory, which also brought home the mortal remains of Admiral Horatio Nelson. He arrived back in England in December 1805.

Gordon became major on 11 August 1808 and lieutenant-colonel on 6 June 1820.

On the death of his father in 1814, Gordon inherited his estates including Cluny Castle; he was already a wealthy man as he also succeeded to his uncle's estate, who had been a merchant in West India. He purchased further properties, including North and South Uist, Benbecula and Barra. He was described by architectural historian H. Gordon Slade as a "model landlord" to tenants on his Aberdeenshire properties, although he was responsible for the expelling of tenants in the Highland Clearances from the islands. Tenants from his estates on the Outer Hebrides (around 3000 people) were made to emigrate to Canada in 1851. After the British government introduced the Slavery Abolition Act 1833 Gordon received a compensation payment from it of £24,964. His six plantations in the Caribbean island of Tobago had 1383 slaves.

Gordon was the Member of Parliament (MP) for Weymouth and Melcombe Regis from 1826 to 1832.

He became an Honorary Colonel in 1836.

Gordon died a bachelor without legal issue in 1858; of his illegitimate children, John Gordon of Cluny, his eldest son, was the only one to outlive him. The Cluny estate passed to Lady Emily Gordon Cathcart who continued sending the evictees to Saskatchewan.

References

GORDON, John (c.1776-1858), of Cluny, Aberdeen, History of Parliament Online

External links 
 

2

1770s births
1858 deaths
UK MPs 1826–1830
UK MPs 1830–1831
UK MPs 1831–1832
Members of the Parliament of the United Kingdom for English constituencies
People from Aberdeenshire
19th-century Scottish people
British Militia officers
Scottish politicians
British graffiti artists
Tory MPs (pre-1834)
British Army personnel of the Napoleonic Wars
Scottish slave owners
Military personnel from Aberdeenshire